Justice Savage may refer to:

Albert R. Savage (1847–1917), justice of the Maine Supreme Judicial Court
Patrick Savage (judge) (fl. 1990s–2010s), New Zealand judge who served as Chief Justice of Niue

See also
Judge Savage (disambiguation)